The G-Force GF05 is a racing car developed and produced by American manufacturer Élan Motorsport Technologies for Panoz, with original work having been performed by G-Force Technologies prior to its purchase by Panoz, for use in the Indy Racing League. G-Force was once again a constructor for the second generation of IRL cars. G-Force would famously again visit victory lane in the Indianapolis 500 in 2000 with Chip Ganassi Racing's Juan Pablo Montoya. Élan purchased G-Force in 2002, and the production of the chassis was moved to Braselton for its final season. The second-generation G-Force IRL chassis competed in the series from 2000 to 2002.

References

External links
Élan Motorsport Technologies official website
Panoz Auto Development official website

Panoz vehicles
IndyCar Series
Open wheel racing cars